Jorge Piqueras (18 July 1925 – 2 October 2020) was a Peruvian-born visual artist. He is recognized as one of the most important Peruvian artists of the twentieth century. Among contemporary Latin American artists, he is also a pioneer in geometric painting.  Piqueras’ work covers a wide range of materials and media, including sculpture, painting, collage, photography and assemblage.

Throughout his career, Piqueras has maintained the freedom to explore and experiment with varied art forms and styles, creating a body of work in which the unexpected is emblematic.  He was a close friend of Jorge Oteiza and Marcel Duchamp, whom he considered his mentors as well as models.

Piqueras has lived and worked extensively in Europe, in particular Italy and France. Since 2007, he has shown regularly in Lima, Peru. The Museum of Art of Lima organized a period retrospective of his geometric work from the 1950s in May 2011.

Early years 
Piqueras was born in the School of Fine Arts in Lima, Peru, where his father, Manuel Piqueras-Cotolí, was resident professor of sculpture. His father, A Spanish national, was renowned as an architect, urban designer and sculptor. His mother was Zoila Sanchez-Concha Aramburú, of a traditional Lima family.

Piqueras-Cotolí's most noteworthy works in Lima include the Plaza San Martin (the Lima town square), the Olivar park (San Isidro) and the façade of the School of Fine Arts. In 1927, President Augusto B. Leguía commissioned Piqueras-Cotolí to design the Peruvian Pavilion for the 1929 Ibero-American Exposition (world's fair) in Seville.  He travelled with his family to Seville to supervise the construction of the Pavilion, which also houses numerous sculptures by him. The family returned to Peru in 1930.

Jorge Piqueras realized his first sculptures and drawings in 1935. The death of his father in 1937, at the age of 52, was a serious blow to him. Shortly after this he met the Spanish sculptor Victorio Macho, who had come to Lima to realize a monument to Miguel Grau.

In 1944, Piqueras entered the Academia de Arte of the Universidad Católica where he studied under Adolfo Winternitz, a Viennese expatriate artist. Three years later, after winning the Baltazár Gavilán National Sculpture Prize, he met the Spanish sculptor Jorge Oteiza, who was visiting Lima, and developed a strong relationship with him.

In 1949, with a scholarship from the Instituto de Cultura Hispánica, Piqueras travelled to Europe where he was to remain for several years. Initially he lived and worked with Jorge Oteiza in Bilbao, Spain.  From there he travelled to Florence, Italy, where he met and married Grati Baroni, a native of Florence. He began to show his work in galleries in Italy, as well as in Paris.

Career 
Piqueras began an intense period of geometric painting in 1952, which was to last seven years. In 1953, he was chosen to represent Peru in the II Biennale de San Paolo, Brazil with his sculptures. Two years later he participated in the International Exposition in Valencia, Venezuela with paintings.

In 1957 Piqueras participated in the XII Salon de Réalités Nouvelles in Paris with paintings; his work was commented on by the French critic Leon Degand, in Art Aujourd’hui.

Numerous exhibitions followed in cities throughout Italy as well as other cities in Europe. During this period, the Italian critic Alberto Boato presented his work in the Galleria del Cavallino (Venice): "…Piqueras unites forcefulness and violence with a firm sense of assuredness, of dominion, of clarity and precision."

In 1959, he began a major series of paintings known as the Black Series. In 1960, he participated in the XXX Biennale Internazionale de Venezia, his work is noted by Alain Jouffroy, among others: "…Piqueras and [Emilio Rodriguez-]Larrain, both of them very interesting for their sense of mystery and the magical power of their forms…"

Piqueras moved to Paris in 1961. In summers in Cadaqués, Spain, he developed strong and lasting friendships with Marcel Duchamp, Man Ray, George Staempfli, Mary Callery, Barbara Curtis, Alfonso Mila, Jose Antonio Rumeu and others.

An intense period of exhibitions followed in Paris and throughout Europe, as well as in New York. The art journal mETRO published an extensive article on his work with texts by Alain Jouffroy, Paul Steinberg and Bruno Alfieri, editor of the magazine. He was invited to participate in the exhibition "Latin American Art in Paris" in the Musee d’Art Moderne in 1962.

In 1963, Henri Cartier-Bresson took a photograph of Marcel Duchamp in his studio; in the photograph, there is only one painting on the wall directly behind Duchamp – a painting by Piqueras that Duchamp had acquired. Cartier-Bresson later gave Piqueras a copy of this photograph as a gift, in thanks for a gouache Piqueras had given him as a gift.

Marcel Duchamp nominated Piqueras for the William and Noma Copley Foundation Prize (Chicago, USA) in 1964; he was chosen as the winner of the prize by a jury that included Roland Penrose, Roberto Matta, Marcel Duchamp, Herbert Read, Max Ernst, Patrick Waldberg and William Copley.

Piqueras participated in the XXXII and the XXXIII Biennale Internazionale de Venezia, in 1964 and ‘66. 
But I must add to that list [of the 8-9 most noteworthy artists...] Piqueras, a great painter who nonetheless is scandalously little known, to whom Peru, his home country, has given only two walls plus a fraction of another, when they should rather have presented him like Le Parc or Stenvert or Raysse, giving him the generous amplitude of an entire room, appropriately lit and arranged to favor the works so as to allow the neophyte and uninspired visitor to have a one-in-a-thousand opportunity to "see" – and I mean exactly that, to "see" – what fate has put before his eyes: these marvels of mental purity and rigor.
- Alain Jouffroy

A decade of sculpture: Él 
In 1968, Piqueras began to develop the emblematic figure "Él", a recurrent presence in Piqueras’ sculpture. The figure was featured in a solo exhibition of sculpture in Villeparisis, France.

This personage, who struggles vainly in an absurd situation, gives an impression of solitude, a solitude that could be called cosmic, in a world that can only be described with the vocabulary of the desert – not at all a Saharan desert or a polar one, but rather a lunar desert: sidereal – a world that is totally cold and therefore, strangely indifferent. What's more, the character remains identical throughout; only the material of the columns that sustain him vary (marble, metal and wood), symbolizing a world where change is the rule. What is the meaning of this search for permanence, this resistance to change? Are we still talking about sculpture?
- J. Thuller (catalog of the show)

In "Volterra 73" — an exhibition organized by Enrico Crispolti in Volterra, Italy — the figure appears on traffic signals, walls and monuments throughout the city, as well as a large sculpture, "Monumento alla Liberta" (3 meters tall), installed in the main square, the Piazza dei Priori. 
 
I participate in this manifestation with huge interest. [...] "Interventi nella citta" (Interventions in the City)... offers concrete opportunities to demolish the... loathesome barriers between the public and Art... to propose direct contact with the artist without unfortunate intermediaries. Not through the bars of cage-gallery-zoos, but in the open, surrounded by stunning landscapes, urban as well. I wish to make it clear that I detest cultural safaris.Out of bounds. Prohibitions. One-way streets. Street signs. Conditionings of all sorts… in the middle of this [my personage] trying to escape, or at least to climb something, anything, it doesn’t matter what. Art market or pure Art – it’s all the same. On the walls and astride the violence of a Stop or a One-way sign, the shortcircuit happens […] I use [my personages] to measure, to try to understand what’s going on around me. 
- Jorge Piqueras (catalog of Volterra 73)

In 1975, the personage took center stage once more in a solo exhibition at the Musée d’Art Moderne de la Ville de Paris. The presentation for the catalog was written by Alain Jouffroy.

Piqueras developed a friendship with Italo Calvino, who was struck by the spirit of the sculpture "Impossible N° 1" and its affinity to the main character in his story "Il Conte di Montecristo".

The larger-than-life-size personage "Él", with his full identity kit, was born later - in 1982 - when the architect Sandro Masera saw the figure in Harper's Grand Bazaar and commissioned the bronze for a house he was building in Emilia-Romagna.

In 1969 Jean Dewasne invited Piqueras to participate in the Salon de Mai in Paris (1970).  He took part in this Salon as well as in the Salon de la Jeune Sculpture yearly during the following years.

In Pietrasanta, in 1973, Piqueras convened – together with Alicia Penalba, Giuglio Lazotti, Gianni and Michele Benvenuti and numerous other artists – a homage to Salvador Allende, Chilean President ousted by General Pinochet. Rafael Alberti, Henry Moore, Renato Guttuso, Alberto Moravia, Italo Calvino and many others participated by signing posters and leaving their handprints – "Non dimentichiamo il Cile" – which were then posted throughout the plaza.  The records of this manifestation were lost in a fire.

In 1975, in "Beloeil 1, Aperçu de la sculpture en France" (Parc du Château de Beloeil, Belgium), Piqueras sculptures were shown together with works by 27 other artists, including Arp, Bury, Calder, Niki de St. Phalle, Ernst, Etienne-Martin, Honegger, Iposteguy, Jacobsen, Magritte, Miró, Reinhoud, Schoffer, Soto and Tinguely.

 An interlude with photography 
Feeling the need to escape from the world of galleries and the art market, in 1978 Piqueras, together with Marina Faust, began to work as a photographer for magazines such Harper's Gran Bazaar, Interni, Ville e Giardini, Casa Vogue, Architecture d’Aujourd’hui, Cree and Corto Maltese. He proposed and realized numerous photo-reportages – including subjects such as Salvador Dalí, Hans Hollein, Hunderwasser, Karl Lagerfeld, Man Ray and Etienne Martin, as well as architecture and other subjects.

 Return to painting and sculpture 
In 1987 Piqueras initiated his return to painting and sculpture. He showed his work for the first time in his native country, Peru, as guest of honor at the III Bienal de Trujillo.  There he met the writer Christine Graves and they married in 1988. Piqueras remained in Peru, initiating a new series of explorations in painting, assemblage, collage and diverse other media.

He realized a solo exhibition in the Municipalidad de Miraflores (Lima) in 1988, which included numerous paintings, assemblages and sculptures that bridged the gap between his work until 1978 and his new creations; these included the monumental sculpture "Altar a la magia".  The works – based on the tree as the central symbol – used lettering, collage, dripping and other techniques to create an atmosphere of invocation and enchantment resembling a sort of rite of fertility (the trunks of the trees took the form of phalluses). Through their association in the works of art, the commonplace materials used (newspaper, tin foil, clay pots, etc.) were converted into ritual elements and altars.

In 1991 Piqueras received a commission to realize a monumental sculpture for the Plaza de los Arqueólogos of the Museo de Sitio, Ancón, Peru – the "Monumento a la  Arqueologia" in travertine.

He was invited to participate in the I Triennale des Ameriques in Maubege, France in 1993.  That same year, he moved to Rome, Italy, where he resided until 1998. There, Piqueras continued to review his own history, recreating works from damaged remnants or timeworn vestiges of earlier pieces, recovering materials found on the street or the beach, using detritus to produce objects and collages with tongue-in-cheek references to erudite or banal subjects. Nothing was lost or discarded. He created a series of ephemeral sculptures, for instance, using emptied eggshells and plaster bandages after his daughter, Arianna, had a cast applied to her leg. His works wavered between the autobiographical and the visionary, between denunciations and invocations, in a critical revision of his past as an artist.

In the Palazzo Ducale of Maierá (Calabria, Italy), in 1996, he conceived and organized the exhibition "Sogni pietrificati" (petrified dreams), including installations in the form of "encounters" between various sculptures and the stones recently excavated for the construction of the nearby amphitheater of M’ara. He invited Iginio Balderi, Eli Benveniste, Alfio Mongelli, Joaquin Roca Rey and Jorgen Haugen Sorensen to display their works within these installations. The exhibition also involved a new "mission" for Él, climbing the wall of the entrance to the palace.

In 1997 Piqueras represented Peru in the XLVII Biennale de Venezia.  In Peru, he participated in the I Bienal Iberoamericana de Lima as guest of honor (Salón de Invitados Especiales).

In 1998, he returned to Peru with his family, where he began to take advantage of the larger spaces available to him to create larger works on canvass.

In 2003, Bruno Alfieri invited Piqueras to realize the trophy for the yearly competition "l’Automobile più bello del mondo", organized by the magazine Automobilia. He created an object with a metal base, painted Ferrari red, holding a wheel woven from bamboo reeds in the style traditionally used in Peru to make firework "castles" for major celebrations.

In 2007, as he prepared to move to Paris, Piqueras presented, in Lima, a major show of his production over the previous years. He continued to do so every two years.

In 2010, Jorge Piqueras was awarded the Orden del Sol al Mérito por Servicios Distinguidos by the Peruvian Ambassador to France in the name of the Republic of Peru.

 Personal life 
Piqueras has four children by his first marriage to the artist Grati Baroni, whom he married in 1952: Ilaria, psychoanalyst (1947); Lorenzo, architect (1953); Gorka, architect (1956); and Francesca, photographer (1960).

With Christine Graves, whom he married in 1988, he has a daughter, Arianna Piqueras, born in 1989.

 Selected exhibitions 

1951	
 Florence, Italy, Galleria Numero (solo exhibition, sculpture)
 Paris, France, Galerie Breteau (solo exhibition, sculpture)
1953	
 São Paulo, Brazil, II Biennale de São Paulo (sculpture)
1955	
 Valencia, Venezuela, Exposition Internacional de la Ciudad de Valencia (painting)
1957	
 Paris, France, 12éme Salon de Réalités Nouvelles (painting)
 Milan, Italy, XX Biennale Permanente (painting)
1958	
 Rome, Italy, First Exhibition of Latin American artists
1959	
 Milan, Italy, Galleria del Grattacielo (solo exhibition, painting)
1960	
 Zurich, Switzerland, Susanne Bollag Gallery (solo exhibition, painting)
 Düsseldorf, Germany, Kunstverein Studio Für Graphiik (solo exhibition, drawings)
 Venice, Italy, XXX Esposizione Internazionale d'Arte, Biennale di Venezia (Peruvian official representation, painting)
1961	
 Milan, Italy, Galleria Lorenzelli (solo exhibition, painting)
1962	
 Paris, France, Galerie Flinker (group show, painting)
 Paris, France, L’Art Latino-américain a Paris, Musée d’Art Moderne de la Ville de Paris 
1963	
 New York, USA, Staempfli Gallery (solo exhibition, painting)
 Cadaqués, Spain, Galeria Uno (solo exhibition, painting)
1964	
 Brussels, Belgium, Galerie Aujourd’hui, Palais de Beaux Arts (solo exhibition, painting)
 Venice, Italy, XXXII Esposizione Internazionale d'Arte, Biennale di Venezia (Peruvian official representation, painting)
 Paris, France, Salon de Mai (sculpture)
1966	
 Paris, France, Galerie Flinker (solo exhibition, painting)
 Venice, Italy, XXXIII Esposizione Internazionale d'Arte, Biennale di Venezia (Peruvian official representation, painting)
1968	
 Saint Paul-de-Vence, France, L’Art Vivant 1965-1968 (painting)
1969	
 Paris, France, Salon de Mai (sculpture)
 Middelheim Antwerp, Belgium, Biennale Internationale de Sculpture
1970	
 Paris, France, Salon de Mai (sculpture)
 Menton, France, VIII Biennale de Menton (sculpture)
 Paris, France, Salon de la Jeune Sculpture
1971	
 Paris, France, IV Exposition Internationale de sculpture contemporaine, Musée Rodin
 Paris, Salon de Mai (sculpture)
 Paris, France, Salon de la Jeune Sculpture
1972	
 Paris, France, Salon de Mai (sculpture)
 Paris, France, Salon de la Jeune Sculpture
 Carrara, Italy, Esposizione Nazionale del Marmo, Sezione Internazionale di Scultura
1973	
 Villeparisis, France, Galerie du Centre Culturel Municipal (solo exhibition, sculpture)
 Volterra, Italy, Volterra 73 - Interventi nella Cittá (sculptures in public space)
1975
 Belgium, Parc du Château de Beloeil, Beloeil 1, Aperçu de la sculpture en France
 Paris, France, Musée d’Art Moderne de la Ville de Paris, ARC 2 (solo exhibition, sculpture)
1976	
 Ville Nouvel d’Évry, Agora Place des Terrasses, 11 Sculptures
1977	
 Paris, France, FIAC - stand Galerie Attali (sculptures and preliminary studies)
1982	
 Berlin, Germany, Künstler aus Lateinamerika, Berliner Künstlerprogramme (group show, sculpture)
1987	
 Trujillo, Peru, III Bienal de Trujillo (Guest of Honour)
1988	
 Lima, Peru, Sala de la Municipalidad de Miraflores (solo exhibition, painting and sculpture)
1990	
 Lima, Peru, Galería Camino Brent (solo exhibition, painting)
1992	
 Los Angeles, California, Iturralde Gallery (solo exhibition, painting)
1993	
 Maubeuge, France, I Triennale des Amériques 1993 (painting)
1996	
 México D.F., Museo José Luis Cuevas, Homenaje a Juan W. Acha (itinerant group show, painting)  	
 Maierà, Calabria, Italy, Palazzo Ducale, Sogni Pietrificati (curator, group show, sculpture and installation)
1997	
 Venice, XLVII  Esposizione Internazionale d'Arte, Biennale di Venezia (Peruvian official representation, painting)  
 Lima, Peru, I Bienal Iberoamericana de Lima, Salón de  Invitados Especiales (painting)
1999    
 Lima, Peru, Museo de Arte de Lima, Partidas, Retornos y Exilios Interiores en las décadas de los ‘80 y ‘90 (painting and sculpture)
2005	
 Lima, Peru, Galería Lucía de la Puente, 10th anniversary (group show, sculpture)
2007    
 Lima, Peru, Galería Lucía de la Puente (solo exhibition, painting)
2011    
 Lima, Peru, Museo de Arte de Lima (MALI), Jorge Piqueras: De la estructura al estallido – Una geometría en proceso, 1952-1959, (monographic solo exhibition, geometric painting)   
2013 	
 Copenhagen, Denmark, Gallery Claus Christensen, Jorge Piqueras and Jorgen Haugen Sorensen, Two One-of-a-Kind (two-man show, painting and sculpture)
2014	
 Lima, Peru, Museo de la Nacion, 1st ComparArt (biennial art show; painting, sculpture, photography, video art, street art)
2015	
 Lima, Peru, Museo de Arte de Lima, The Other Edge: Geometric Painting in Peru 1947–1958 (group show, painting)
2016	
 Lima, Peru, Galería Lucía a de la Puente (solo exhibition, painting)

 Selected bibliography 

 Books 
 Art Actuel, SKIRA Annuel, No 2, (1976). Editions d’Art Albert Skira, Geneva, p 94. 
 Museo de Arte de San Marcos, (2014). Colección de Arte Contemporáneo, Tomo II, Editorial Súper Gráfica EIRL, Lima, p 126. 
 Crispolti, Enrico (1968). Ricerca dopo l’ informale, Oficina Edizioni, Rome, pp 136, 162, 260, 287, 288, 71. 
 Crispolti, Enrico (1977). "Da Volterra 73 alla Biennale 1976", in Arte visive e partecipazione sociale, De Donato, Bari. 
 Crispolti, Enrico (1973). Volterra ’73: Sculture, ambientazioni, visualizzazioni, porgettazioni per l’alabastro, Comune di Volterra. 
 Enciclopedia Italiana di Scienze, Lettere, ed Arti (1979). Instituto de la Enciclopedia Italiana, Rome. 
 Enciclopedia Universale SEDA dell’Arte Moderna (n.d.), Vol 6. IDAF (Instituto para la Difusión del Arte Figurativo), Milan. 
 Gough-Cooper, Jennifer and Caumont, Jacques (1993). Marcel Duchamp, Gruppo Editoriale Fabbri Bompiani, Milan.  
 Jouffroy, Alain (1964). Une revolution du regard, Editorial Gallimard, París. 
 Jouffroy, Alain (1966). "The Paris International Avant-Garde", in New Art Around the World, Harry N. Abrams Inc. Publishers, New York, pp 82, 92, 247, 26. 
 Lerner, Sharon (ed.) (2013). Arte Contemporaneo, Museo de Arte de Lima, Lima. 
 MALI, Jorge Piqueras: Dibujos, Cuadernos – 1952-1959 (2012). Museo de Arte de Lima, Lima. 
 Metro International Directory of Contemporary Art (1964). Editoriale Metro, Milan, pp 292–293. 
 Museo de Arte de San Marcos, (2014). Colección de Arte Contemporáneo, Tomo II, Editorial Súper Gráfica EIRL, Lima, p 126. 
 Pelay Orozco, Miguel (1978). Oteiza: Su Vida, su Obra, su Pensamiento, su Palabra, Editorial La Gran Enciclopedia Vasca, Bilbao, p 354. 
 Sabino, Catherine and Tondini, Angelo (1985). "Cremonesi, A revival of 1930s rationalism", in Italian Style, Clarkson N. Potter Inc. Publishers, New York. 
 Trivelli, Carlo (2003). "Aproximaciones a la escultura de Jorge Piqueras", in Homenaje a Ana Magcano: I Simposio sobre Escultura Peruana del Siglo XX, Lima: Pontificia Universidad Católica del Perú.

 Magazines 
 Alfieri, Bruno (1961). "Jorge Piqueras", Metro, No 2: 62–67.
 Art International (January 1967). Nº 11: 75.
 Artspace (January–April 1992). Nº 1-2: 26. 
 "Caminos De Piqueras" (26 de agosto de 1990). Sí, Nº 184: 71-72.
 De Grada, Rafaelle (September–November 1966). "La via chiusa della XXXIII Biennale", Arte  club, Nº 30: 10-21.
 De Szyszlo, Fernando (9 November 1992). "1942-1992 y la palabra que la designa", Oiga p 96-100, 103.
 Degand, Leon (June 1957). "Le XII Salon des Realités Nouvelles", Art d’aujour d’hui, Nº 13: 25. 
 Del Valle, Augusto (2012). "La invención de una tradición", Hueso Húmero, Nº 60, Mosca Azul, Lima, Peru.
 Domus, (September 1959), Nº 358: 17.
 Gatellier, Gilber (August–November 1966). "Trois expositions en coup de poing", Arts Loisirs, Nº 59: 55.
 Il Collesionista d’Arte Moderna (July 1962). Bolaffi Editore, p 161.
 Jouffroy, Alain (1966). "Jorge Piqueras", Syn, Nº 1.
 Jouffroy, Alain (July–August 1966). "Le grand jeu de la Biennale", L’Oeil, Nº 139-140: 44-51, 61.
 Jouffroy, Alain (June 1962). "Les ‘nouveantés parisiennes’ et le futur". Domus, Nº 391: 31-32.
 Jouffroy, Alain (1961). "La volenté d’ordre et la volenté de désordre se combattent avec acharnement dans l’ouevre de Piqueras", Metro, Nº 2: 68-69.
 Lama, Luis (12 December 1988). "Poesía amor mío", Caretas, Nº 1036: 68-69.
 Le Grandi Automobili (The Great Cars) (Winter 2003). Automobilia, Milan. 
 "L’impossibile: Improbabili storie di libertà" (March–April 1979). Harper’s Gran Bazaar, Nº 1 (see also cover).
 Piqueras, Jorge (May–June 1982). "Il Castello dello Stupore, un’Architettura di Jorge Piqueras", Harper’s Gran Bazaar Nº 5–6: 118-121.
 Schonenberger, Gualtiero (May 1961). "Jorge Piqueras", Art International, Vol XI/1: 75-76.
 Steimberg, Paul (1961). "Une lettre sur Piqueras", Metro, Nº 2: 102.
 "The noble experiment at Cadaques" (9 September 1963). Life International, Vol 35, Nº 5: 62-67.
 Umbro, Apolonio. Quadrum, Nº 8: 183.
 Umbro, Apolonio. Quadrum, Nº10: 160–161.
 "Una famiglia esplosiva" (23 April 1959). Vita, p 51.
 Villacorta, Jorge (17 September 1990). "Jorge Piqueras: La soledad del que mira", Oiga, Nº 500: 54-56.
 Villacorta, Jorge (22 September 1990). "El sueño de Piqueras". Página Libre'', cultural magazine, p 4

Newspaper articles 
 "Arte peruano en Europa" (9 September 1951),  El Comercio, Sunday magazine, Lima, p 13.
 Balta, Aída (18 December 1988)."Provocaciones intelectuales", El Comercio, Lima.
 Bartra, Jacques (13 December 1988). "La magia de Piqueras", Expreso, Lima.
 Bartra, Jacques (4 September 1990). "Recordarse a uno mismo", Expreso, Lima p 14.
 Bosquet, Alain, (7 November 1966). "Jorge Piqueras", Combat (Paris), p 9.
 Coya, Hugo (10 January 1988). "El feliz retorno", Lundero, La Industria, Trujillo, p 8. 
 De la Jara, César (30 November 1950). "Tres nombres", Numero, Florence, p 4.
 "Due scultori peruviani" (10 May 1951). L"Unita, Rome, p 3. 
 Flores, Pilar (29 March 1992). "En Ancón: Un monument al pasado y al future de la arqueología", Cronicas, El Comercio, Lima.
 "Jorge Piqueras e Roca Rey al Bar Cennini" (12 February 1952). Il nuovo corriere, Florence.
 "Jorge Piqueras Sánchez-Concha obtuvo el premio Baltazar Gávilan" (29 April 1948). El Comercio, Lima, p 8.
 Jouffroy, Alain (22 October 1964). "L’oeuvre de Piqueras", Beaux Arts (Bruselas), No 1064, p 13.
 Jouffroy, Alain (3 September 1961). "La voluntad de orden y la voluntad de desorden combaten encarnizadamente en la obra de Piqueras", El Comercio, Lima, Sunday magazine, p 4.
 Jouffroy, Alain (June 1960). "Proclame que l’art moderne est l’oeuvre de jeunes gens révoltés", Arts (Paris), No 780, p 16.
 Lama, Luis (30 August 1987). "Reencuentro plástico con el Perú", Lundero, La Industria, Trujillo, p 6-7.
 Lores, Eduardo (24 June 2000). "Hombre de contrastes", El Comercio, Lima, p C8.
 "Los escultores peruanos Roca Rey y Piqueras exhiben con éxito en París", (9 June 1951). El Comercio, Lima.
 Mallonee, Laura C.  (26 May 2015). "The Geometric Origins of Modern Painting in Peru", Hyperallergic, (http://hyperallergic.com). "Mostre romane" (10 May 1951). L’Unite, Roma.
 MP (18 December 1988). "… y de París a su país", Lundero, La Industria (Trujillo).
 Niño de Guzmán, Guillermo (4 December 1988). "El retorno de Jorge Piqueras", Primera Semana, Lima, pp 4–5.
 Niño de Guzmán, Guillermo (4 December 1988)."Piqueras: Goce del instante", El Comercio, Lima, p C1.
 "Piqueras e Roca Rey" (12 February 1952). La Nazione Italiana, Florencia. 
 "Piqueras y Él" (22 November 1987). Lundero, La Indústria, Chiclayo-Trujillo.
 R. V. "Piqueras et Roca Rey" (June 1951). Arts, París.
 Rodriguez Saavedra, Carlos (1965). "De pintura", El Comercio, Lima.
 Schonenberger, Gualtiero. "Jorge Piqueras" (4 de mayo de 1959). La Gazzetta Ticinese, Lugano.
 Solari Swayne, Manuel (1963). "Un artista peruano que triunfa: Jorge Piqueras", El Comercio, Lima.
 Solari Swayne, Manuel. "Jorge Piqueras Sánchez-Concha" (8 May 1947). El Comercio, Lima, p 8.
 Trucchi, Lorenza (16 May 1951. "Due scultori peruviani", Il Momento, Rome, p 3.
 Ugaz, Martín (18 March 2002). "Jorge Piqueras: Breve acercamiento", Identidades, El Peruano, Lima.
 Valsecchi, Marco (8 April 1961). "Piqueras", Il Giorno, Milan.
 VQ (3 May 1951). "In via Romagna polvere degli Incas", Il Momento, Rome, p 3.

Catalogs 
 Alfieri, Bruno (1960). "Piqueras", XXX Bienal Internacional de Venecia.
 Alfieri, Bruno; Boatto, Alberto; Valeschi, Marco; Degand, Leon (1959). "Jorge Piqueras", Galería Il Fondaco, Messina. 
 "Beloeil, Apercu dela Sculpture en France" (June 1975). Parc du Chateau de Beloeil, Bélgica.
 "IV Exposition Internationale de Sculpture Contemporaine" (1971). Musée Rodin, París.
 Degand, Léon. "Jorge Piqueras" (October 1957). Galleria del Fiore, Milan.
 Graves, Christine (2000). Primera Bienal Iberoamericana, Lima.
 Graves, Christine (1996). "Jorge Piqueras", in Pintura peruana de la década de los 90, homenaje a Juan Hacha, Museo José Luis Cuevas, Mexico City.
 Graves, Christine (June 1997). "Jorge Piqueras", XLVII Bienal de Venezia, Instituto Italo–Latinoamericano, Rome.
 Graves, Christine (August 1990). "Reflexiones sobre el aprender a mirar", Galería Camino Brent, Lima.
 Jouffroy, Alain (March 1975). "Piqueras ou l’occupation d’un musée par un prissionier évadé", Musée d’Art Moderne de la Ville de Paris, París.
 Jouffroy, Alain (October 1963). "Jorge Piqueras", Galería Staempfli, Nueva York.
 "Kunstler aus Lateinamerika" (June 1982). DAAD Galerie, Berlín. Municipalidad Metropolitana de Lima (Septiembre 1997). I Bienal de Lima, Tele 2000, Lima, p 121. 
 "L’art et la route" (July 1977). 3er Salon d’Art Contemporain de Saint Junien, París.
 Pierluca (1957). "Jorge Piqueras", Galleria Numero, Florence.
 "Perú" (1964). Group show of the Peruvian representation in the XXXII Bienal Internacional de Venecia, Lima.
 "Ia Rassegna Internazionale di Scultura Contemporanea" (September 1973). Casina Rossa, Lucca.
 "Tableaux Modernes et Contemporains" (November 1986). Nouveau Drouot, París.
 "2da Bienal de Arte Contemporáneo de Trujillo" (November 1985). Casa Ganoza, Banco Industrial, Trujillo.
 Thuller, J (March 1973). "Piqueras", Centre Cultural Municipal de Villeparisis, Villeparisis.
 Venturi, Leonelo (Abril 1951). "Roca e Jorge Piqueras", Galleria Lo Zodiaco, Rome.
 Villacorta, Jorge (January 2000). "Rumbos de la plástica peruana", Club Regatas de Lima, Lima.

References

People from Lima
Peruvian sculptors
1925 births
2020 deaths